Oliver Jack Hawkins (born 1992) is an English professional footballer who plays as a striker or centre back for League Two side Gillingham.

Club career

Early career
Hawkins began his career at North Greenford United but it was at Hillingdon Borough where he really began to break through, scoring 10 goals during the 2010–11 season. He joined Northwood in 2011. Hawkins would finish as Northwood's top scorer, scoring 19 goals in all competitions in both seasons (2011–12, 2012–13).

Unsurprisingly Hawkins' excellent form attracted the attention of clubs at higher levels, and the striker duly signed for then Southern League Premier Division side Hemel Hempstead Town in the summer of 2013 having impressed in pre-season. Hawkins would spend time at Isthmian League side Harrow Borough, before returning and establishing himself as a regular for the Tudors.

During the 2013–14 season, Hawkins helped Hemel Hempstead Town earn promotion as champions of the Southern League Premier Division, making 23 league appearances and scoring four times. During the 2014–15 season he found his goalscoring touch, and he also lined up against Bury in the first round of the FA Cup. The striker remained a prolific scorer as the club embarked on their second season in the National League South.

Dagenham & Redbridge
On 15 January 2016, Hawkins completed his move to League Two side Dagenham & Redbridge for an undisclosed fee on a two-and-a-half-year deal. Hawkins had first come to the attention of Dagenham boss John Still when Still was manager of Luton Town. He made his debut the next day as an 81st-minute substitute against Northampton Town. His first Football League goal came on 20 February 2016 in a 3–2 defeat against Mansfield Town. Hawkins was unable to help prevent Dagenham's relegation to the National League in 2016.

Portsmouth
On 31 August 2017, Hawkins signed for League One side Portsmouth on transfer deadline day, joining on a 3-year deal. He made his debut for Portsmouth against Rotherham United on 3 September. He scored his first goal for the club in a 3–0 win over Bristol Rovers on 26 September. He scored 8 goals in 35 appearances in his first season at the club, including braces in wins against Milton Keyenes Dons and Northampton Town. Hawkins displayed versatility for Portsmouth, filling in as a central defender on several occasions during his time at the club.

Hawkins became a key part of the Portsmouth squad during the 2018–19 season. He featured regularly as a striker as Portsmouth finished 4th in the league, while also reaching the final of the 2018–19 EFL Trophy Final, which took place on 31 March 2019 at Wembley. Hawkins scored the winning spotkick in the penalty shootout to win the trophy for Portsmouth for the first time in the club's history.

He featured less regularly during the 2019–20 season, making 9 starts and 3 substitute appearances without scoring during an injury hit season. Hawkins left Portsmouth at the end of the 2019–20 season after Pompey's play-off semi final exit.

Ipswich Town
On 17 August 2020, Hawkins signed a 2-year deal at League One side Ipswich Town. He made his debut for the club on 5 September, featuring as a second-half substitute in a 3–0 home win over Bristol Rovers at Portman Road in a first round EFL Cup tie. He scored his first goal for Ipswich in a 1–0 win over Crewe Alexandra on 31 October 2020. On 22 January, Ipswich announced that Hawkins required a knee operation which would rule him out of action for up to 6 weeks. He ended the season having made 23 appearances for Ipswich, scoring once.

Mansfield Town
On 21 June 2021, Hawkins joined Mansfield Town for an undisclosed fee, signing a two-year deal.  He scored on his debut in a 2-1 win against Bristol Rovers. On 28 May 2022 he was sent off in the League Two play-off final against Port Vale.

Gillingham
Hawkins joined fellow League Two club Gillingham in January 2023 for an undisclosed fee.

Career statistics

Honours
Hemel Hempstead Town
Southern League Premier Division: 2013–14

Portsmouth
EFL Trophy: 2018–19

References

External links

1992 births
Living people
English footballers
Association football forwards
North Greenford United F.C. players
Hillingdon Borough F.C. players
Northwood F.C. players
Hemel Hempstead Town F.C. players
Harrow Borough F.C. players
Dagenham & Redbridge F.C. players
Portsmouth F.C. players
Ipswich Town F.C. players
Mansfield Town F.C. players
Gillingham F.C. players
Southern Football League players
Isthmian League players
National League (English football) players
English Football League players